The 1977–78 Austrian Hockey League season was the 48th season of the Austrian Hockey League, the top level of ice hockey in Austria. Eight teams participated in the league, and ATSE Graz won the championship.

Regular season

Playoffs

Semifinals
EC KAC - HC Salzburg 3:0 (7:3, 9:4, 5:2)
ATSE Graz - ECS Innsbruck 3:2  (5:4 OT, 2:1 OT, 4:5 SO, 2:3, 4:3)

Final
EC KAC - ATSE Graz 1:3 (1:3, 7:0, 3:6, 3:6)

External links
Austrian Ice Hockey Association

Austria
Austrian Hockey League seasons 
Aust